Ulf Erik Wahlstedt (born 16 April 1976) is a Swedish former professional footballer who played as a defender and midfielder. He is best remembered for his time with Helsingborgs IF with which he won two Allsvenskan titles and four Svenska Cupen titles, but also represented BK Astrio, IFK Göteborg, and Esbjerg fB during a career that spanned between 1993 and 2012. He won two caps for the Sweden national team and was a player for the UEFA Euro 2004.

Club career 
Beginning his career with BK Astrio, he signed for the Allsvenskan club IFK Göteborg in 1994 and helped the team win the 1994, 1995, and 1996 Allsvenskan titles. He also represented IFK Göteborg in the UEFA Champions League. He signed for Helsingborgs IF in 1997 and helped the club win the 1999 Allsvenskan and a Svenska Cupen title before leaving for Esbjerg fB in Denmark. He returned to Helsingborg in 2004 and won another Allsvenskan title and three other Svenska Cupen titles before retiring in 2012.

International career 
Wahlstedt represented the Sweden U17, U19, and U21 teams a total of 40 times before making his full international debut for Sweden on 24 January 1998 in a friendly game against the United States, playing for 76 minutes in a 1–0 loss before being replaced by Mats Lilienberg. Six years later, on 28 April 2004, he won his second and last international cap in a friendly 2–2 draw with Portugal. He was named in the Sweden national football team for UEFA Euro 2004 in Portugal, but did not play.

Career statistics

International

Honours 
IFK Göteborg

 Allsvenskan: 1994, 1995, 1996

Helsingborgs IF

 Allsvenskan: 1999, 2011
 Svenska Cupen: 1997–98, 2006, 2010, 2011

References

External links
 
 
 
 

1976 births
Living people
Swedish footballers
Sweden international footballers
Sweden under-21 international footballers
Sweden youth international footballers
Allsvenskan players
Danish Superliga players
IFK Göteborg players
Esbjerg fB players
Helsingborgs IF players
UEFA Euro 2004 players
Swedish expatriate footballers
Expatriate men's footballers in Denmark
Association football defenders
Footballers from Gothenburg